Rodney Scott may refer to:

 Rodney Scott (actor) (born 1978), American actor
 Rodney Scott (baseball) (born 1953), infielder in Major League Baseball
 Rodney Scott (law enforcement officer), Chief of the United States Border Patrol
Rodney Scott (pitmaster)